Damir Vrabac (born 10 May 1962) is a former Bosnian football player who played for several Bosnian and Slovenian clubs during the 1980s and 1990s. His brother Dinko Vrabac is also a football player.

External links
PrvaLiga profile 

1962 births
Living people
People from Velika Kladuša
Association football midfielders
Yugoslav footballers
Bosnia and Herzegovina footballers
FK Sarajevo players
NK Iskra Bugojno players
NK Olimpija Ljubljana (1945–2005) players
NK Slavija Vevče players
Yugoslav First League players
Slovenian PrvaLiga players
Bosnia and Herzegovina expatriate footballers
Expatriate footballers in Slovenia
Bosnia and Herzegovina expatriate sportspeople in Slovenia
Bosnia and Herzegovina football managers